Bobs Creek is a river in the James Bay and Abitibi River drainage basins in Cochrane District in northeastern Ontario, Canada. It flows  from Bobs Lake to its mouth at the Shallow River.

Course
The Shallow River flows via the Black River to the Abitibi River.

See also
List of rivers of Ontario

References

Rivers of Cochrane District